Falkovitshella physalis is a moth of the family Scythrididae. It was described by Mark I. Falkovitsh in 1972. It is found in Mongolia and Uzbekistan.

References

Scythrididae
Moths described in 1972
Moths of Asia